Aghireșu is a commune in Cluj County, Transylvania, Romania.

The commune has an area of 105.79 km2 and a population of 7156 people (2007). It is composed of eleven villages: Aghireșu, Aghireșu-Fabrici (Egeres-gyártelep), Arghișu (Argyas), Băgara (Bogártelke), Dâncu (Dank), Dorolțu (Nádasdaróc), Inucu (Inaktelke), Leghia (Jegenye), Macău (Mákófalva), Ticu (Forgácskút) and Ticu-Colonie (Ferencbánya).

Demographics

According to the 2011 census, Romanians made up 51.9% of the population, Hungarians made up 36.7% and Roma made up 8.0%.

Natives
Andrei Ianko

Notes

References
Atlasul localităților județului Cluj (Cluj County Localities Atlas), Suncart Publishing House, Cluj-Napoca,

External links

  Administrative map of the county

Communes in Cluj County
Localities in Transylvania